Olgierd Porebski (6 September 1922 – June 1995) was a British fencer. He competed in the individual and team sabre events at the 1952 and 1956 Summer Olympics.

References

1922 births
1995 deaths
British male fencers
Olympic fencers of Great Britain
Fencers at the 1952 Summer Olympics
Fencers at the 1956 Summer Olympics
Polish emigrants to the United Kingdom